Tsaritsyno is a district within the Southern Administrative Okrug of Moscow. Area: 426,2 ha. Its current name is traced back to 1775. Previously, Tsaritsyno was known under several other names: the Chernogryaznaya Waste (from 1589), Chernaya Gryaz (before 1683/84 and from 1612), Bogorodskoye settlement (after 1684) and Lenino (September 28, 1918 – August 1991). Tsaritsyno hosts such landmarks as Tsaritsyno Palace and Arshinovskiy Forest Park.

In 1960, Lenino was incorporated into the Proletarsky District of Moscow and, in 1968, to  Krasnogvardeysky District.

Districts of Moscow